The Ministry of Roads and Bridges is a ministry of the Government of South Sudan. The incumbent minister is Gier Chuang Aluong, while Simon Majok Majak serves as deputy minister.

List of Ministers of Roads and Bridges

See also
 Ministry of Transport and Roads (South Sudan)

References

Roads and Bridges
South Sudan, Roads and Bridges